Combretum trifoliatum is a vine (rarely a shrub) of the family Combretaceae. It is found from Myanmar across Southeast Asia and Wallacea to New Guinea and Australia. It grows in wet places, including where it can be submerged for four months a year by floodwaters. It is unusual in retaining its photosynthesizing leaves when flooded. Parts of the plant are used in traditional medicine.

Description
The vine/climber (or shrub) can have a stem diameter up to 4 cm, described as "stout woody liana".
Leaves are some 8.5-16 x 4–6.5 cm in size, with petioles some 03–0.5 cm in length. Domatia are tufts of hair, if present. On plagiotropic (horizontal or oblique) shots the leaves are opposite in arrangement, but on orthotropic (vertical) shoots there is whorled arrangement. Both young shoots and vegetative buds are covered in dark brown hairs. The flowers have a hypanthium (calyx tube) some 1.3mm long, calyx lobes some 0.8mm in length, 1.1mm long petals, a disc surrounding base of style, 10 stamens, 4.5mm long style, small stigma and the flowers grow terminally. Fruit is more or less sessile, some 35-40 x 10-12mm in size, 5 longitudinal ribs, transverse section is markedly lobed, the seeds are some 15-20mm in length, embryos are more or less five-winged and some 15-20mm in length. The vine maintains its photosynthesizing leaves during flooding, unlike many others in its habitats.

Distribution
The species is found in Southeast Asia, Wallacea and Sahul/greater Australian continent. It grows in the following countries and regions: Australia (only known from the Weipa area in Cape York, Queensland); Papua New Guinea (mainland); Indonesia (Papua (province), Nusa Tenggara, Sulawesi, Kalimantan, Jawa, Sumatera); Timor Leste; Malaysia (Sabah, Sarawak, Peninsular Malaysia); Brunei Darussalam; Thailand; Cambodia; Vietnam; Laos; and Myanmar.

Habitat
The plant grows in secondary formations in Southeast Asia, quite common in wet places.
In the Tonlé Sap floodplains, Combretum trifoliatum occurs frequently in the swamp forests dominated by Barringtonia acutangula and Diospyros cambodiana and in scrublands, where it can often assume a shrub form. Along the Mekong at the Pha Taem National Park, the species grows as an "extreme rheophyte", surviving up to 4 months of submergence in flood waters. They grow as low clumping shrubs on sandy soils, including those in rock crevices. They are dispersed in the running water.

Vernacular names
In Khmer Combretum trifoliatum is known as (voër) trâhs''', or trâs.
In the Vientiane region of Laos, the plant is called ben nám.
In Vietnamese, it is called Chưn bầu ba lá or Trâm bầu ba lá.

Uses
The species is used in traditional medicine in Cambodia: the sap (obtained by splitting the stalk) is drunk to cure dysentery; paste of the roasted fruit is mixed with palm sugar to make balls which are then chewed for oral health; the root is part of a remedy used to treat women with gonorrhoea. The stem is used in Laos.

History
Étienne Pierre Ventenat (1757-1808), French botanist described the species in his Choix de Plantes, dont la Plupart sont Cultivees dans le Jardin de Cels ..., which published over the years 1803 to 1808, with the entry for Combretum trifoliatum'' in the 1804 publication.

Further reading
Additional information can be found in the following:
Dy Phon, P. (2000). Dictionnaire des plantes utilisées au Cambodge: 1–915. chez l'auteur, Phnom Penh, Cambodia.
Govaerts, R. (1999). World Checklist of Seed Plants 3(1, 2a & 2b): 1–1532. MIM, Deurne.
Kress, W.J., DeFilipps, R.A., Farr, E. & Kyi, D.Y.Y. (2003). A Checklist of the Trees, Shrubs, Herbs and Climbers of Myanmar Contributions from the United States National Herbarium 45: 1–590. Smithsonian Institution.
Lê, T.C. (2005). Danh lục các loài thục vật Việt Nam [Checklist of Plant Species of Vietnam] 3: 1–1248. Hà Noi: Nhà xuất bản Nông nghiệp.
Newman, M., Ketphanh, S., Svengsuksa, B., Thomas, P., Sengdala, K., Lamxay, V. & Armstrong, K. (2007). A checklist of the vascular plants of Lao PDR: 1–394. Royal Botanic Gardens, Edinburgh.
Turner, I.M. (1995). A catalogue of the Vascular Plants of Malaya Gardens' Bulletin Singapore 47(1): 1–346.
Van Steenis, C.G.G.J. (ed.) (1948-1954). Flora Malesiana 4: 1–631. Noordhoff-Kolff N.V., Djakarta.

References

trifoliatum
Aquatic plants
Flora of Indo-China
Flora of Malesia
Flora of Papuasia
Flora of Queensland
Medicinal plants
Plants described in 1804
Shrubs
Vines